Guatemala sent a delegation to 14th Pan American Games in Santo Domingo, Dominican Republic, from 1–17 August 2003. At the Games, Guatemala garnered a total number of 12 medals: 3 silver and 9 bronze.

Medals

Silver

Men's doubles: Pedro Yang and Erick Anguiano

Women's singles: Sofia Granda

Women's points race: María Molina de Ortíz

Bronze

Men's 50 km race walk: Luis Fernando García

Men's singles: Pedro Yang

Women's Kumite (+58 kg): Cheili González

Mixed Hobie 16: Juan Ignacio Maegli and Andrés López

Women's 100 m backstroke: Gisela Morales
Women's 200 m backstroke: Gisela Morales

Women's −49 kg: Euda María Carias

Results by event

Athletics

Track

Road

Field

Decathlon

Boxing

Cycling

Mountain bike
Edvin Barrios
 Men's cross country — +1 lap (→ 7th place)

Anabella López
 Women's cross country — +1 lap (→ 9th place)

Triathlon

See also
Guatemala at the 2004 Summer Olympics

References

Nations at the 2003 Pan American Games
P
2003